Sokolivka is a village (a selo) in the Zaporizhzhia Raion (district) of Zaporizhzhia Oblast in southern Ukraine. 

Until 18 July 2020, Sokolivka belonged to Vilniansk Raion. The raion was abolished that day as part of the administrative reform of Ukraine, which reduced the number of raions of Zaporizhzhia Oblast to five. The area of Vilniansk Raion was merged into Zaporizhzhia Raion.

References

Zaporizhzhia Raion
Villages in Zaporizhzhia Raion